Kapawe'no 150C, formerly known as Halcro 150C, is an Indian reserve of the Kapawe'no First Nation in Alberta, located within Big Lakes County. It is 17 kilometres northeast of High Prairie.

References

Indian reserves in Alberta